The 1988 NBL season was the seventh season of the National Basketball League. With the relegation of Palmerston North in 1988, Waitemata returned to the NBL following a four-year hiatus after winning the Conference Basketball League (CBL) championship in 1987. Wellington won the championship in 1988 to claim their fourth league title.

Final standings

Finals

Season awards
 Most Outstanding Guard: John Welch (Waitemata)
 Most Outstanding NZ Guard: Byron Vaetoe (Auckland)
 Most Outstanding Forward: Kerry Boagni (Wellington)
 Most Outstanding NZ Forward/Centre: Glen Denham (Waikato)
 Scoring Champion: Tony Webster (North Shore)
 Rebounding Champion: John Martens (Waitemata)
 Assist Champion: Carl Golston (Waikato)
 Young Player of the Year: Warren Adams (New Plymouth)
 All-Star Five:
 Kerry Boagni (Wellington)
 Willie Burton (Hawke's Bay)
 Carl Golston (Waikato)
 Kenny McFadden (Wellington)
 John Welch (Waitemata)

References

External links
1988 Final Telecast – Intro, 1st Half Part 1, 1st Half Part 2, 1st Half Highlights, 2nd Half Part 1, 2nd Half Part 2

National Basketball League (New Zealand) seasons
1988 in New Zealand basketball